Sultan Kudarat State University (SKSU) is a state university in the province of Sultan Kudarat, Mindanao, Philippines. Formerly Sultan Kudarat Polytechnic State College (SKPSC), it became a university in 2010. There are seven campuses within Sultan Kudarat.

The university provides instruction in science and technology, agriculture, fisheries, and education. It also undertakes research and extension services.

History
In 1968, an elementary school was established in Isulan. A barrio high school was established on the grounds of the elementary school later the same year to allow for graduates of the elementary school to continue their education. Isulan Barrio High School became a provincial high school in 1974. In 1975, the high school became Sultan Kudarat National High School.

Sultan Kudarat Polytechnic State College (SKPSC) was established in 1990 out of five high schools in Isulan, Kalamansig, Palimbang, Tacurong, and Lutayan. In 2010, it became Sultan Kudarat State University.

Presidents
Nelson T. Binag, Ph.D. (1990 - 2008)
Teresita L. Cambel, Ed.D. (2008 - 2014)
Rolando F. Hechanova, Ph.D. (2014 - 2022)
Samson L. Molao, Ed.D. (2022 - Present)

Colleges and Campuses

Colleges
College of Agriculture
College of Agribusiness
College of Arts and Sciences
College of Business Administration and Hospitality Management
College of Computer Studies
College of Criminal Justice Education
College of Engineering
College of Fisheries
College of Health Sciences
College of Industrial Technology
College of Law
College of Teacher Education
Graduate School
Laboratory High School

Campuses
 Administration Center Central Site and Services (ACCESS) Campus in EJC Montilla, Tacurong City where the  Laboratory High School, College of Teacher Education (CTE), College of Graduate Studies, College of Law, College of Criminal Justice Education (CCJE) and College of Health Sciences (CHS) are located.
 Tacurong Campus
Bagumbayan Campus
Isulan Campus
Lutayan Campus
Kalamansig Campus
Palimbang Campus

Former campuses
Sen. Ninoy Aquino Campus
Glan Campus
Sunas Extension Campus

Hymn

SKSU HYMN

I

With heads up high and hearts aglow

Proud voices to you we bestow

With joy we sing our praise  to you

Beloved SKSU

II

You taught us love for humankind

Helped solve the riddles  of our mind

You taught us  love for Mother Earth

Her endless wonders and wealth

CHORUS:

Hail to you! Beloved SKSU

Hail to you! We sing to honor to you

Hail to you!  We’re proud of you With Grateful Hearts

We pray that God will bless you Dear SKSU

III

See you children far and near

Heirs of the future, their shouts you hear

With fruit of excellence  they stand

To bless God and transform the land

IV

Time wears out, and mem'ries fade

But the foundation that you laid

Till death will make our vision clear

Thanks to our Alma Mater dear

CHORUS:

Hail to you! Beloved SKSU

Hail to you! We sing to honor to you

Hail to you!  We’re proud of you With Grateful Hearts

We pray that God will bless you!

Hail to you! Beloved SKSU

Hail to you! We sing to honor to you

Hail to you!  We’re proud of you With Grateful Hearts

We pray that God will bless you Dear SKSU

Dear SKSU//

References

State universities and colleges in the Philippines
Universities and colleges in Sultan Kudarat
Educational institutions established in 1990
1990 establishments in the Philippines
Mindanao Association State Colleges and Universities Foundation
Philippine Association of State Universities and Colleges